Karen Mehringer, M.A. (born February 12, 1967), is an author, public speaker, psychotherapist, and the founder of Creative Transformations, an organization whose stated purpose is "to help people awaken, live with purpose, and realize their dreams."

Mehringer was born in Hawaii and raised in California. She holds a master's degree in marriage and family therapy from the University of San Diego. 

In 1998, she and her husband took a six-month ocean voyage to Fiji. Her experiences are presented in her self-help book, Sail Into Your Dreams: 8 Steps to Living a More Purposeful Life, published by Llewellyn in 2007. 

Mehringer is a frequent radio and TV talk show guest, and her articles have been featured in magazines such as Spirit Seeker, Spa Magazine, and New Spirit Journal. 

A noted practitioner in the field of transpersonal psychology, Mehringer has been the featured speaker at a number of conferences, including the Women of Wisdom Conference in Seattle, Washington; the Women of Wisdom Conference in Big Bear, California; and the Celebration Conscious Living Fair in Denver, Colorado. She was the keynote speaker at the 2009 Spirit Seeker's Summer Holistic Expo in St. Louis, Missouri. 

Mehringer and her husband reside in Parker, Colorado.

References

External links
 Karen Mehringer's website

1967 births
21st-century American non-fiction writers
21st-century American women writers
Living people
People from Hawaii
Transpersonal psychologists